Gordon M. Patchin (December 26, 1847 – December 14, 1934) was an American farmer and politician from New York.

Life 
Patchin was born on December 26, 1847, in his family farm in Wayland, New York. His parents were Myron Patchin, one of the founders of Wayland, and Rosillla Parmenter. His grandfather, Walter Patchin, was an American Revolutionary War veteran who was one of the first settlers in the Wayland area.

Patchin attended Dansville Seminary, Naple's Academy, and Rochester Business College. He worked as a farmer and real estate dealer in Wayland. He was a freemason.

In 1891, Patchin was elected to the New York State Assembly as a Republican, representing the Steuben County 1st District. He served in the Assembly in 1892, 1893, 1902, and 1903.

Patchin died at home on December 14, 1934. He was buried in East Wayland Cemetery.

References

External links 

 The Political Graveyard
 Gordon M. Patchin at Find a Grave

1847 births
1934 deaths
People from Steuben County, New York
Farmers from New York (state)
American real estate brokers
Republican Party members of the New York State Assembly
19th-century American politicians
20th-century American politicians
Burials in New York (state)